This is a list of windmills in Estonia.

 
Estonia
Lists of buildings and structures in Estonia